Chrapliwy v. Uniroyal, Inc., 670 F.2d 760 (7th Cir. 1982) is a US labor law decision of the U.S. Seventh Circuit Court of Appeals concerning the award of attorney's fees in a discrimination lawsuit.  The facts of the case involved allegedly discriminatory practices in violation of Title VII of the Civil Rights Act of 1964.  The litigants of the case settled in favor of the plaintiffs, but brought the issue of reasonable attorney's fees to the district court.

Facts
Uniroyal allegedly maintained "a segregated hiring and seniority system at its Mishawaka, Indiana plant where women were heavily employed in the footwear production division, while other lines predominantly employed male employees." Alta Chrapliwy and other female workers filed charges against the company in a class action suit that was eventually settled in their favor after years of litigation.

See also
US labor law
Gender equality
List of gender equality lawsuits

External links

United States labor case law
Gender equality
United States Court of Appeals for the Seventh Circuit cases
1982 in United States case law
Gender discrimination lawsuits
History of women in Indiana